The Key to Perfection is a promo album by Swiss electronic duo Yello, released on 4 September 2012. It was not released on a label, and was distributed by Volkswagen officials at special events. The record contains additional vocals by Billy Mackenzie (on track 3), Heidi Happy (on track 4), and Malia (on track 7).

Background
The Key to Perfection is a soundtrack for the new VW Golf 7. The album has all new remixed modern versions of celebrated songs: "The Race", "Oh Yeah/Goldrush", "Vicious Games", and "Desire". All the classic songs have been re-imagined in a new modern style.

Track listing

References

External links
The Key to Perfection YELLO creates the soundtrack for the new VW Golf 7

2012 albums
Yello albums